Nikkei can refer to:

, abbreviated , Nikkei, a large media corporation in Japan
, abbreviated , Nikkei, a major business newspaper published in Japan
, a Japanese stock market index, published by Nihon Keizai Shimbun
, often simply Nikkei, people in the Japanese diaspora
, a Japanese-language newspaper published in São Paulo, Brazil